The Ruth Hadden Memorial Award is a former award for the best first novel published in Britain, which was administered by the Booktrust. It was awarded in the early 1990s and has now been discontinued.

The award was unusual in that the prize was awarded to a completed manuscript before acceptance by a publisher, and the prize money (in 1994, £2000) went to the publishers of the novel to spend on promoting it.

Winners
1991: The Last Room, by Elean Thomas
1992: Leaving the Light On, by Catherine Merriman
1993: In the Place of Fallen Leaves, by Tim Pears
1994: Pig, by Andrew Cowan

References

British literary awards
First book awards
Awards established in 1991
Awards disestablished in 1994
1991 establishments in the United Kingdom
1994 disestablishments in the United Kingdom